Yalgyz-Narat (Yañğıźnarat) is a rural locality (a selo) and the administrative centre of Yalgyz-Naratsky Selsoviet, Tatyshlinsky District, Bashkortostan, Russia. The population was 462 as of 2010. There are 9 streets.

Geography 
Yalgyz-Narat is located 31 km southwest of Verkhniye Tatyshly (the district's administrative centre) by road. Bashkibash is the nearest rural locality.

References 

Rural localities in Tatyshlinsky District